The 24th Online Film Critics Society Awards, honoring the best in film for 2020, were announced on January 25, 2021. The nominations were announced on January 19, 2021.

Da 5 Bloods received the most nominations with eight, winning Best Actor for Delroy Lindo. Nomadland won all six of its nominations, including Best Picture.

Winners and nominees

{| class="wikitable"
|-
! style="background:#EEDD82; width: 50%"| Best Picture
! style="background:#EEDD82; width: 50%"| Best Director
|-
| valign="top" |
 Nomadland
  Da 5 Bloods
 Promising Young Woman
 Never Rarely Sometimes Always
 First Cow
 Minari
 Sound of Metal
 I'm Thinking of Ending Things
 Soul
 The Trial of the Chicago 7
| valign="top" |
 Chloé Zhao – Nomadland
 Emerald Fennell – Promising Young Woman
 Eliza Hittman – Never Rarely Sometimes Always
 Spike Lee – Da 5 Bloods
 Kelly Reichardt – First Cow
|-
! style="background:#EEDD82; width: 50%"| Best Actor
! style="background:#EEDD82; width: 50%"| Best Actress
|-
| valign="top" |
 Delroy Lindo – Da 5 Bloods as Paul
 Riz Ahmed – Sound of Metal as Ruben Stone
 Chadwick Boseman – Ma Rainey's Black Bottom as Levee Green (posthumous)
 Anthony Hopkins – The Father as Anthony
 Steven Yeun – Minari as Jacob Yi
| valign="top" |
 Frances McDormand – Nomadland as Fern
 Jessie Buckley – I'm Thinking of Ending Things as Young Woman
 Viola Davis – Ma Rainey's Black Bottom as Ma Rainey
 Sidney Flanigan – Never Rarely Sometimes Always as Autumn Callahan
 Carey Mulligan – Promising Young Woman as Cassandra "Cassie" Thomas
|-
! style="background:#EEDD82; width: 50%"| Best Supporting Actor
! style="background:#EEDD82; width: 50%"| Best Supporting Actress
|-
| valign="top" |
 Leslie Odom Jr. – One Night in Miami... as Sam Cooke
 Sacha Baron Cohen – The Trial of the Chicago 7 as Abbie Hoffman
 Chadwick Boseman – Da 5 Bloods as "Stormin'" Norman Earl Holloway (posthumous)
 Bill Murray – On the Rocks as Felix Keane
 Paul Raci – Sound of Metal as Joe
| valign="top" |
 Maria Bakalova – Borat Subsequent Moviefilm as Tutar Sagdiyev
 Olivia Colman – The Father as Anne
 Talia Ryder – Never Rarely Sometimes Always as Skylar
 Amanda Seyfried – Mank as Marion Davies
 Youn Yuh-jung – Minari as Soon-ja
|-
! style="background:#EEDD82; width: 50%"| Best Animated Feature
! style="background:#EEDD82; width: 50%"| Best Film Not in the English Language
|-
| valign="top" |
 Soul
 Onward
 Over the Moon
 The Wolf House
 Wolfwalkers
| valign="top" |
 Minari (United States)
 Another Round (Denmark)
 Bacurau (Brazil)
 Collective (Romania)
 La Llorona (Guatemala)
|-
! style="background:#EEDD82; width: 50%"| Best Documentary
! style="background:#EEDD82; width: 50%"| Best Debut Feature
|-
| valign="top" |
 Dick Johnson Is Dead
 Boys State
 Collective
 The Painter and the Thief
 Time
| valign="top" |
 Emerald Fennell – Promising Young Woman
 Radha Blank – The Forty-Year-Old Version
 Regina King – One Night in Miami...
 Darius Marder – Sound of Metal
 Andrew Patterson – The Vast of Night
|-
! style="background:#EEDD82; width: 50%"| Best Original Screenplay
! style="background:#EEDD82; width: 50%"| Best Adapted Screenplay
|-
| valign="top" |
 Emerald Fennell – Promising Young Woman
 Danny Bilson, Paul De Meo, Kevin Willmott, and Spike Lee – Da 5 Bloods
 Lee Isaac Chung – Minari
 Eliza Hittman – Never Rarely Sometimes Always
 Aaron Sorkin – The Trial of the Chicago 7
| valign="top" |
 Chloé Zhao – Nomadland
 Charlie Kaufman – I'm Thinking of Ending Things
 Kemp Powers – One Night in Miami...
 Jonathan Raymond and Kelly Reichardt – First Cow
 Ruben Santiago-Hudson – Ma Rainey's Black Bottom
|-
! style="background:#EEDD82; width: 50%"| Best Cinematography
! style="background:#EEDD82; width: 50%"| Best Editing
|-
| valign="top" |
 Joshua James Richards – Nomadland
 Christopher Blauvelt – First Cow
 Erik Messerschmidt – Mank
 Newton Thomas Sigel – Da 5 Bloods
 Hoyte van Hoytema – Tenet
| valign="top" |
 Chloé Zhao – Nomadland
 Alan Baumgarten – The Trial of the Chicago 7
 Kirk Baxter – Mank
 Adam Gough – Da 5 Bloods
 Jennifer Lame – Tenet
|-
! colspan="2" style="background:#EEDD82; width: 50%"| Best Original Score
|-
| colspan="2" valign="top" |
 Trent Reznor and Atticus Ross – Soul
 Terence Blanchard – Da 5 Bloods
 Ludwig Göransson – Tenet
 Emile Mosseri – Minari
 Trent Reznor and Atticus Ross – Mank
|}

Special awards

Technical Achievement Awards
 Emma. – Costume Design
 The Invisible Man – Visual Effects
 Mank – Production Design
 Sound of Metal – Sound Design
 Tenet – Visual Effects

Lifetime Achievement Awards
 Rob Bottin (Makeup Artist)
 David Byrne (Composer)
 Jane Fonda (Actor)
 Jean-Luc Godard (Director)
 Frederick Wiseman (Documentarian)

Special Achievement Awards
 Small Axe – Director Steve McQueen created a series of films for the small screen that rivals the best of the theatrical features of the year, that can be seen individually and yet work together to explore a cultural experience largely unseen on big screens, television, or streaming to date.
 Distributor Kino Lorber, for being the first company to offer virtual film distribution as a way to help independent theaters during the pandemic through the Kino Marquee.
 Kudos to the independent theater entities that participated in presenting "Virtual Cinema" when forced to close due to the pandemic. Films that otherwise may not have been seen were made available through online platforms, with ticket prices shared by the distributor with the theater.

Non-U.S. Releases
 A Beast in Love (Japan)
 The Disciple (India)
 Ghosts (Turkey)
 Mogul Mowgli (United Kingdom)
 New Order (Mexico)
 Notturno (Italy)
 Rocks (United Kingdom)
 Saint Maud (United Kingdom)
 Summer of 85 (France)
 Undine (Germany)

Films with multiple nominations and awards

References

External links
 
 2020 AWARDS (24TH ANNUAL) at ofcs.org

2020 film awards
2020